Andrei Gennadyevich Kirilenko (born February 18, 1981) is a Russian-American basketball executive and former professional basketball player, currently the commissioner of the Russian Basketball Federation.

At age fifteen, Kirilenko began playing professional basketball in the Russian Basketball Super League. He spent three years with CSKA Moscow from 1998 to 2001, winning the Russian league MVP award in 2000. In 2001, Kirilenko joined the Utah Jazz, who drafted him twenty-fourth overall in 1999. He became the first Russian player selected in the first round of a draft and the youngest European player drafted. He made the NBA All-Rookie First Team after his first season, was an NBA All-Defensive Team pick three times and played in the 2004 All-Star Game. During the 2011 NBA lockout, Kirilenko spent another year with CSKA Moscow, leading them to the 2012 EuroLeague Final. The same year, he was named the competition's Most Valuable Player, earned an All-EuroLeague first team selection and won the EuroLeague Best Defender award.

Since the 2000 Summer Olympics, Kirilenko has been a regular member of the Russian national team. With Russia, he won the EuroBasket title in 2007, earning MVP honors in the process. In 2011, he won his second EuroBasket medal, this time the bronze. He was selected to the All-Tournament Team on both occasions. Kirilenko was named FIBA Europe Men's Player of the Year twice, and won a Euroscar Player of the Year award in 2012.

Kirilenko is nicknamed "AK-47", in reference to his initials, the jersey number he wore, and the AK-47 rifle. Coincidentally, Kirilenko was born in the city of Izhevsk, in the former Soviet Union (now in Russia), where the weapon was first manufactured. In January 2011, he became a U.S. citizen.

Early life
Kirilenko was born in the Soviet city of Izhevsk, Russia. When he was ten, he began playing organized basketball.

Professional career

Spartak St. Petersburg (1997–1998) 
In 1997, Kirilenko became the youngest player ever to compete in the Russian Super League, spending two seasons with Spartak Saint Petersburg.

CSKA Moscow (1998–2001) 
Kirilenko joined CSKA Moscow in 1998. In his first season, he helped his new team win the Russian Super League championship. He was also selected to participate in the Russian All-Star game, helping the West beat the East 138–107 and winning the slam dunk contest.

Utah Jazz (2001–2011)
On June 30, 1999, at age , Kirilenko was the youngest foreign player at the time to be drafted in the National Basketball Association, when the Utah Jazz selected him with the 24th pick. Kirilenko was also the first Russian picked in the first round of an NBA Draft. However, he remained with CSKA Moscow for the next two seasons. In the 1999–2000 season, he helped his team win the championship of the North European Basketball League and its second Russian Super League championship in a row. On April 23, 2000, he participated in his second Russian All-Star game, helping the West beat the East 122–111. Despite being the odds-on favorite to win the slam dunk contest, he finished second to Harold Deane of Lokomotiv Mineralnye Vody.

Kirilenko participated in the 2000 Summer Olympics as a member of the Russian national basketball team, which finished 8th in the tournament. He showed off his all-around skills in the SuproLeague, finishing in the top ten in 7 out of 8 statistical categories.

Kirilenko joined the Utah Jazz in 2001. He was named to the first team on the NBA All-Rookie Team. He emerged as one of the top young players in the NBA, and one of the league's top weak-side defenders. He was selected to play as a reserve in the 2004 NBA All-Star Game in Los Angeles. In the 2003–04 NBA season, he ranked third in the league in blocked shots per game and fourth in the league in steals per game, becoming just the second player in NBA history to rank in the top five in both categories (David Robinson ranked first in blocked shots per game and fifth in steals per game in the 1991–92 NBA season). During the NBA off-season, Kirilenko played for the Russian national basketball team.

Kirilenko became the leader of the Jazz in 2003 after John Stockton retired and Karl Malone left Utah to join the Los Angeles Lakers. He played and started in 78 of the Utah's 82 games and led them to a 42–40 record. Utah missed the playoffs by one game behind the Denver Nuggets. He finished fifth in Defensive Player of the Year voting and fourth in Most Improved Player voting and was named to the second team on the All-NBA Defensive Team. Kirilenko led the Jazz in many statistical categories:

Total points: 1,284
Points per game: 16.5
Total rebounds: 629
Rebounds per game: 8.1
Blocks: 215
Blocks per game: 2.8
Steals: 150
Steals per game: 1.9
Free throws made: 392
Free throws attempted: 496
Three-pointers made: 68
Three-pointers attempted: 201

In the middle of the 2004–05 season against the Washington Wizards, Kirilenko sustained a broken right wrist, sidelining him for the remainder of the season. Despite only playing in 41 of 82 games for the Jazz, he amassed enough blocked shots during the season to qualify as the league leader in blocks per game, and was named to the second team on the NBA All-Defensive Team.

In the 2005–06 season Kirilenko was again among the league's best shot blockers and defenders. He recorded a career high 10 blocks against Indiana on March 26, and finished first in the league with total blocks (220) and second in blocks per game with 3.2, just behind league leader Marcus Camby at 3.3. He was named to the first team on the NBA All-Defensive Team.

Kirilenko averaged 15.3 points, 8 rebounds, 1.5 steals, 3.2 blocks and 4.3 assists per game in the 2005–2006 season.

Kirilenko and Hakeem Olajuwon are the only 2 NBA players who have finished a game with at least 6 steals, 6 blocks, 6 points, 6 rebounds, 6 assists since 1985–86.

The 2006–2007 season was a tremendous disappointment for Kirilenko. While playing in 70 games and not missing much playing time, he averaged career lows in points (8.3) and field goal attempts (6.0). It has been said that much of this decline can be attributed to the main offensive emphasis on Carlos Boozer, Deron Williams, and Mehmet Okur, and that Kirilenko was uncomfortable losing his position as the main go-to guy on the team. His frustration eventually culminated in a widely publicized breakdown near the end of the Jazz's first-round playoffs series against the Houston Rockets. Kirilenko bounced back to lead Russia to the championship in EuroBasket 2007, and was named MVP of the tournament. Following his performance in the 2007 EuroBasket, he asked to be released from his contract to return to Russia to play basketball.

Despite the trade rumors and controversy created by these statements, he rebounded in the 2007–08 NBA season and backed off on trade demands. His statistics for the 2007–08 NBA season were 11.0 ppg, 4.7 rpg, 4.0 apg, 1.2 spg, and 1.5 bpg, all of which were improvements over his previous season's stats (with the exception of blocks and rebounds). He worked out personally with former Jazz shooting guard Jeff Hornacek on his shooting in the 2007 off-season, and his field goal percentage improved from 47% to 51%. Most impressively, his 3-point shooting improved from 21% to a career-high 38%.

Return to CSKA (2011–2012) 
Amid the 2011 NBA lockout, Kirilenko returned to Russia to play for his old team CSKA Moscow. Although the lockout was resolved in December, Kirilenko remained with CSKA Moscow for the rest of the season rather than pursue an immediate return to the NBA. At the end of the season, he was named the 2011–12 EuroLeague MVP and selected to the All-EuroLeague First Team. Over 17 games in the EuroLeague, he averaged 14.1 points and 7.5 rebounds, in 29.9 minutes per game.

Minnesota Timberwolves (2012–2013)
On July 27, 2012, Kirilenko signed with the Minnesota Timberwolves. He was the team's starting small forward, playing in 64 games during the 2012–13 NBA season. Kirilenko missed 18 games because of back spasms, then a right quadriceps strain, and finally a calf strain. He finished the season with averages of 12.4 points, 5.7 rebounds, 2.8 assists, and a 51% field goal percentage per game. He had his best game on November 14, 2012, when he had 26 points and 12 rebounds on an 89-87 loss to the Charlotte Bobcats. On June 29, 2013, Kirilenko opted out of the final year of his contract with the Timberwolves (worth $10 million) to become a free agent.

Brooklyn Nets (2013–2014)
On July 12, 2013, Kirilenko signed a two-year deal with the Brooklyn Nets. On June 23, 2014, he exercised his $3.3 million player option, re-signing with the Nets for the 2014–15 season. On November 21, 2014, he took a leave of absence from the Nets due to personal reasons.

Third stint with CSKA (2015) 
On December 11, 2014, Kirilenko was traded, along with Jorge Gutiérrez, the Nets' second round draft pick in 2020 and the right to swap second round picks in 2018, to the Philadelphia 76ers in exchange for Brandon Davies. The 76ers suspended Kirilenko without pay on January 9, 2015 for failing to report after the trade, and on February 21, he was waived by the 76ers before playing in a game for them.

On February 24, 2015, Kirilenko signed with CSKA Moscow of the VTB United League for the rest of the 2014–15 season, returning to the club for a third stint. With Kirilenko at the club for the second half of the season, CSKA Moscow managed to advance to the EuroLeague Final Four for the fourth straight season, after eliminating Panathinaikos for the second straight season in the quarterfinals, with a 3–1 series win. However, in the semi-final game, despite being dubbed by media as an absolute favorite to advance, Kirilenko's team, CSKA, once again lost to Olympiacos. The final score was 70–68, after a great Olympiacos comeback in the fourth quarter, led by Vassilis Spanoulis. CSKA Moscow eventually won the third place game, after defeating Fenerbahçe 86–80. Over 11 games played in the EuroLeague, he averaged 8.5 points and 5.3 rebounds per game. CSKA Moscow finished the season by winning the VTB United League, after eliminating Khimki with a 3–0 series win in the league's finals series.

On June 23, 2015, Kirilenko announced his retirement from playing professional basketball. Afterwards, he moved on to become the head of the Russian Basketball Federation.

National team career
As a member of the Russian junior national team, Kirilenko was the MVP of the 1999 FIBA Under-19 World Cup. Kirilenko's first major international tournament with the senior Russian national basketball team was at the 2000 Summer Olympics, where Russia finished the games in 8th place. Later, he played at the EuroBasket 2001, where Russia finished 5th among 16 teams. The only time that Kirilenko played in a FIBA World Cup was at the 2002 FIBA World Championship, where the Russian team finished 10th out of 16 teams. Kirilenko has also played at 4 more EuroBaskets: the EuroBasket 2003, the EuroBasket 2005, the EuroBasket 2007, where he won the gold medal of the competition, and was named the MVP of the tournament, and the EuroBasket 2011. With the win in the 2007 EuroBasket, Russia qualified to the 2008 Summer Olympics, where Kirilenko also played for Russia, and he was also named Russia's flag bearer for the Opening Ceremony of the games.

In the first game of the 2008 Olympics tournament against Iran, Kirilenko scored 15 points, pulled down 5 rebounds, and blocked 3 shots. Against Croatia, he led his team in points scored with 18, and he scored his personal best in the games against Argentina, scoring 23.

Kirilenko won a bronze medal with Russia at the 2012 Summer Olympics.

Career statistics

NBA

Regular season

|-
| style="text-align:left;"| 
| style="text-align:left;"| Utah
| 82 || 40 || 26.2 || .450 || .250 || .768 || 4.9 || 1.1 || 1.4 || 1.9 || 10.7
|-
| style="text-align:left;"| 
| style="text-align:left;"| Utah
| 80 || 11 || 27.7 || .491 || .325 || .800 || 5.3 || 1.7 || 1.5 || 2.2 || 12.0
|-
| style="text-align:left;"| 
| style="text-align:left;"| Utah
| 78 || 78 || 37.1 || .443 || .338 || .790 || 8.1 || 3.1 || 1.9 || 2.8 || 16.5
|-
| style="text-align:left;"| 
| style="text-align:left;"| Utah
| 41 || 37 || 32.9 || .493 || .299 || .784 || 6.2 || 3.2 || 1.6 ||style="background:#cfecec;"| 3.3* || 15.6
|-
| style="text-align:left;"| 
| style="text-align:left;"| Utah
| 69 || 63 || 37.7 || .460 || .308 || .699 || 8.0 || 4.3 || 1.5 || 3.2 || 15.3
|-
| style="text-align:left;"| 
| style="text-align:left;"| Utah
| 70 || 70 || 29.3 || .471 || .213 || .728 || 4.7 || 2.9 || 1.1 || 2.1 || 8.3
|-
| style="text-align:left;"| 
| style="text-align:left;"| Utah
| 72 || 72 || 30.8 || .506 || .379 || .770 || 4.7 || 4.0 || 1.2 || 1.5 || 11.0
|-
| style="text-align:left;"| 
| style="text-align:left;"| Utah
| 67 || 10 || 27.3 || .449 || .274 || .785 || 4.8 || 2.6 || 1.2 || 1.1 || 11.6
|-
| style="text-align:left;"| 
| style="text-align:left;"| Utah
| 58 || 35 || 29.0 || .506 || .292 || .744 || 4.6 || 2.7 || 1.4 || 1.2 || 11.9
|-
| style="text-align:left;"| 
| style="text-align:left;"| Utah
| 64 || 62 || 31.2 || .467 || .367 || .770 || 5.1 || 3.0 || 1.3 || 1.2 || 11.7
|-
| style="text-align:left;"| 
| style="text-align:left;"| Minnesota
| 64 || 64 || 31.8 || .507 || .292 || .752 || 5.7 || 2.8 || 1.5 || 1.0 || 12.4
|-
| style="text-align:left;"| 
| style="text-align:left;"| Brooklyn
| 45 || 4 || 19.0 || .513 || .200 || .513 || 3.2 || 1.6 || .9 || .4 || 5.0
|-
| style="text-align:left;"| 
| style="text-align:left;"| Brooklyn
| 7 || 0 || 5.1 || 0.0 || 0.0 || .750 || 1.1 || .1 || .1 || .0 || .4
|- class="sortbottom"
| style="text-align:center;" colspan="2"| Career
| 797 || 546 || 30.2 || .474 || .310 || .754 || 5.5 || 2.7 || 1.4 || 1.8 || 11.8
|- class="sortbottom"
| style="text-align:center;" colspan="2"| All-Star
| 1 || 0 || 12.0 || .333 || .000 || .000 || 1.0 || .0 || .0 || 1.0 || 2.0

Playoffs

|-
| style="text-align:left;"| 2002
| style="text-align:left;"| Utah
| 4 || 4 || 30.5 || .393 || .000 || .813 || 3.8 || 1.0 || 1.8 || 2.5 || 8.8
|-
| style="text-align:left;"| 2003
| style="text-align:left;"| Utah
| 5 || 0 || 29.0 || .419 || .143 || .875 || 4.8 || 1.4 || .6 || 2.0 || 11.6
|-
| style="text-align:left;"| 2007
| style="text-align:left;"| Utah
| 17|| 17 || 31.0 || .447 || .333 || .785 || 5.2 || 2.6 || .9 || 2.4 || 9.6
|-
| style="text-align:left;"| 2008
| style="text-align:left;"| Utah
| 12 || 12 || 32.3 || .447 || .227 || .714 || 3.4 || 2.5 || 1.5 || 1.7 || 11.0
|-
| style="text-align:left;"| 2009
| style="text-align:left;"| Utah
| 5 || 3 || 27.2 || .468 || .200 || .714 || 2.8 || 2.0 || 2.2 || .6 || 11.0
|-
| style="text-align:left;"| 2010
| style="text-align:left;"| Utah
| 2 || 0 || 15.0 || .500 || .000 || 1.000 || 3.0 || .0 || .5 || .5 || 5.5
|-
| style="text-align:left;"| 2014
| style="text-align:left;"| Brooklyn
| 10 || 0 || 14.4 || .467 || .000 || .647 || 2.3 || 1.0 || 1.0 || .3 || 2.5
|- class="sortbottom"
| style="text-align:center;" colspan="2"| Career
| 55 || 36 || 27.1 || .445 || .208 || .767 || 3.9 || 1.9 || 1.2 || 1.6 || 8.7

EuroLeague

|-
| style="text-align:left;"| 2011–12
| style="text-align:left;"| CSKA Moscow
| 17 || 17 || 29.9 || .533 || .417 || .758 || style="background:#cfecec;"| 7.5 || 2.4 || 1.5 || style="background:#cfecec;"| 1.9 || 14.1 || style="background:#cfecec;"| 24.2
|-
| style="text-align:left;"| 2014–15
| style="text-align:left;"| CSKA Moscow
| 11 || 9 || 19.3 || .518 || .462 || .682 || 5.3 || 1.2 || 1.1 || 1.2 || 8.5 || 13.9
|- class="sortbottom"
| style="text-align:center;" colspan="2"| Career
| 28 || 26 || 25.7 || .529 || .426 || .734 || 6.6 || 1.9 || 1.4 || 1.6 || 11.9 || 20.2

Player profile

Kirilenko was a versatile "big man" who could play either forward spot. He was noted for his high-level play in both offense (11.8 points and 5.5 rebounds per game NBA career averages) and defense (twice topping three blocks per game for a season). On offense, he was proficient in drawing fouls, passing, and possessed a quick first step. He was three times selected into the NBA All-Defensive First or Second Team. Staples of Kirilenko's defensive power were his shot blocking (with an NBA career average of 1.8 per game) and in stealing the ball (NBA career average of 1.4 per game).

On January 3, 2006, against the Los Angeles Lakers, Kirilenko posted a stat line of 14 points, 8 rebounds, 9 assists, 6 steals, and 7 blocks. This was the third time in his career he achieved a five-by-five. It was also the first-ever regulation "5×6" — a game in which a player registers at least 6 points, 6 rebounds, 6 assists, 6 blocks, and 6 steals — since the NBA began recording blocks and steals in the 1973–74 season. In 1987, Hakeem Olajuwon had 38 points, 17 rebounds, 12 blocks, 7 steals, and 6 assists for the Houston Rockets, in a double-overtime win over the Seattle SuperSonics, the only other time a player has earned a 5×6.

In June 2015, FiveThirtyEight reviewed Kirilenko's statistics. His efficiency in scoring, steals, blocks, assists, offensive rebounds, and all-around versatility, suggest that Kirilenko could be justifiably considered for the Basketball Hall of Fame.

Personal life
Kirilenko is married to Russian pop singer Masha "Marina" Lopatova, whose stage name is MaLo. Lopatova is the daughter of Russian basketball player Andrey Lopatov. Kirilenko met Lopatova at a youth basketball camp in Moscow, and Kirilenko appeared in one of Lopatova's music videos. In January 2011, Kirilenko and his wife acquired American citizenship. The couple have three sons, Fedor, Stepan and Andrey, and a daughter named Alexandra. ESPN The Magazine reported in 2006 that Masha allows Andrei to have sex with another woman once per year and quoted her: "Male athletes in this country are extremely attractive. They get chased by women. It's hard to resist. It's the way men are by nature." 

Sources suggest Kirilenko was a World of Warcraft (WoW) gamer while playing in the NBA. In the words of former NBA player Channing Frye, he shared a story about being up at 3am the night before an NBA game while playing WoW, when he noticed Kirilenko was online as well. Frye asked Kirilenko if he was ready for the next day's NBA game, and Kirilenko replied "Yeah, probably."

See also
 
 List of National Basketball Association career blocks leaders
 List of National Basketball Association single-game blocks leaders
 2008 Summer Olympics national flag bearers
 List of European basketball players in the United States

References

External links

 
 Former official website
 Andrei Kirilenko at beijing2008.cn
 
 Andrei Kirilenko at euroleague.net
 Andrei Kirilenko at fiba.com

1981 births
Living people
2002 FIBA World Championship players
American men's basketball players
Basketball players at the 2000 Summer Olympics
Basketball players at the 2008 Summer Olympics
Basketball players at the 2012 Summer Olympics
BC Spartak Saint Petersburg players
Brooklyn Nets players
Euroscar award winners
FIBA EuroBasket-winning players
Medalists at the 2012 Summer Olympics
Minnesota Timberwolves players
National Basketball Association All-Stars
National Basketball Association players from Russia
Olympic basketball players of Russia
Olympic bronze medalists for Russia
Olympic medalists in basketball
PBC CSKA Moscow players
Power forwards (basketball)
Russian emigrants to the United States
Russian expatriate basketball people in the United States
Russian men's basketball players
Small forwards
Sportspeople from Izhevsk
Basketball players from Saint Petersburg
Utah Jazz draft picks
Utah Jazz players